Nada Saafan (born 10 September 1996) is an Egyptian synchronized swimmer. She competed in the women's team event at the 2016 Summer Olympics.

References

1996 births
Living people
Egyptian synchronized swimmers
Olympic synchronized swimmers of Egypt
Synchronized swimmers at the 2016 Summer Olympics
Place of birth missing (living people)